Michael John Volland (born 1974) is a British Anglican priest and academic, specialising in mission and practical theology. Since 2017, he has been Principal of Ridley Hall, Cambridge, an Anglican theological college in the Open Evangelical tradition. He was previously Director of Mission at Cranmer Hall, Durham, and Director of Context-based Training at Ridley Hall.

Early life and education
Volland was born in 1974. He studied fine art at Northumbria University, graduating with a Bachelor of Arts (BA) degree in 1996.

For six years, prior to entering theological college, Volland worked as a youth minister. He studied youth ministry and theological education at King's College London, and completed a Master of Arts (MA) degree in 2004. From 2004 to 2006, he trained for ordained ministry at Ridley Hall, Cambridge, an Anglican theological college in the Open Evangelical tradition.

Volland later undertook postgraduate research at Durham University, and completed a Doctor of Theology and Ministry (DThM) degree in 2013. His doctoral thesis was titled "An entrepreneurial approach to priestly ministry in the parish: insights from a research study in the Diocese of Durham".

Ordained ministry
Volland was ordained in the Church of England as a deacon in 2006 and as a priest in 2007. He served as a pioneer minister leading a fresh expressions church in Gloucester between 2006 and 2009, and was also a curate of Gloucester Cathedral from 2007 to 2009. In 2009, he joined Cranmer Hall, Durham as tutor and Director of Mission. From 2014 to 2015, he was also missioner/leader of the East Durham Mission Project, and acting area dean of Easington, County Durham. The East Durham Mission Project is a group of nine parishes in former mining communities in the Diocese of Durham.

In 2015, Volland was appointed a tutor and Director of Context-based Training of Ridley Hall, Cambridge, and so he left the Diocese of Durham to move south in August 2015. Since 2015, he has also held permission to officiate in the Diocese of Ely. In December 2016, it was announced that he would be the next Principal of Ridley Hall. He took up the position in January 2017.

Military service
In addition to his parish and academic ministries, Volland has served as a military chaplain. On 25 February 2013, he was commissioned in the Royal Army Chaplains' Department as a Chaplain to the Forces Fourth Class (equivalent in rank to captain). He then joined the Durham Army Cadet Force as a chaplain. On 24 June 2015, with his moving to Cambridge, he resigned his commission.

Personal life
Volland is married to Rachel. Together they have three children.

Selected works

References

1974 births
Living people
21st-century English Anglican priests
Church of England priests
Evangelical Anglican clergy
Staff of Cranmer Hall, Durham
Staff of Ridley Hall, Cambridge
Alumni of Northumbria University
Alumni of King's College London
Alumni of Ridley Hall, Cambridge
Royal Army Chaplains' Department officers
Alumni of Durham University